Frozen Fury is an annual pre-season ice hockey game between the Los Angeles Kings and the Vegas Golden Knights of the National Hockey League (NHL), held in Salt Lake City since 2021. A previous incarnation of the series was held between the Kings and the Colorado Avalanche in Las Vegas from 1997 to 2016. On four occasions, the Los Angeles Kings faced different teams instead of the Avalanche, once each against the Arizona Coyotes, the San Jose Sharks, New York Rangers, and the Dallas Stars. The 15th Frozen Fury was originally supposed to take place on September 29, 2012, but was cancelled due to the NHL lockout. It resumed September 27–28, 2013, with the New York Rangers making their debut in the series.

The first game to be played in Las Vegas was also the first outdoor game in the league's history: 14,000 fans came to a rink set up outside Caesars Palace to see the Kings defeat the New York Rangers 5–2 on September 28, 1991. The air temperature was 85 °F (29 °C) during the game. The game served as a predecessor to both the Frozen Fury series (which was played indoors) and the NHL Winter Classic, the annual regular season game held on New Year's Day that began in 2008.

From 1997 to 2015, these games were played at MGM Grand Garden Arena; in 2016, they were played at T-Mobile Arena. The 2016 games were the end of the original tradition, due to the launch of the Vegas Golden Knights in the 2017–18 season.

In 2021, a new Frozen Fury series was launched at Vivint Arena in Salt Lake City between the Kings and the Golden Knights.

The games

Frozen Fury I (1997) 

Scoring summary

Frozen Fury II (1998)

Frozen Fury III (1999)

Frozen Fury IV (2000)

Frozen Fury V (2001)

Frozen Fury VI (2002)

Frozen Fury VII (2003)

Frozen Fury VIII (2005)

Frozen Fury IX (2006)

Frozen Fury X (2007)

Frozen Fury XI (2008)

Frozen Fury XII (2009)

Frozen Fury XIII (2010)

Frozen Fury XIV (2011)

Frozen Fury XV (2013) 

Scoring summary

Scoring summary

Frozen Fury XVI (2014)

Frozen Fury XVII (2015)

Frozen Fury XVIII (2016)

Frozen Fury SLC I (2021) 

Scoring summary

Frozen Fury SLC II (2022) 

Scoring summary

Records

References 

Recurring events established in 1997
Colorado Avalanche games
Los Angeles Kings games
Vegas Golden Knights games
Ice hockey in Nevada
Sports competitions in Las Vegas
MGM Grand Garden Arena
Ice hockey in Utah
Sports competitions in Salt Lake City